Ansberry is a surname. Notable people with the surname include:

Timothy T. Ansberry (1871–1943), American politician
Tom Ansberry (born 1963), American long-distance runner